Sketchy may refer to:

 pertaining to one of the uses of Sketch (disambiguation)
 Sketchy (album), a 2021 album by Tune-Yards
 Sketchy Andy (Andy Lewis, born 1986), performer and extreme sports athlete
 Sketchy Bongo (Yuvir Pillay, born 1989), South African record producer and songwriter 
 Sketchy, three EPs (1999, 2000, 2005) by Jonah Matranga or as Onelinedrawing
 "Sketchy", an episode of Haven (season 1)

See also